Redemption is a collectible card game based on the Bible. It involves Biblical characters, places, objects, and ideas. The object of the game is for players to use their Heroes (good characters) to rescue Lost Souls by defeating their opponent's Evil Characters, with the first player to rescue five Lost Souls winning the game. Redemption was first published in July 1995 by Cactus Game Design and its creator, Rob Anderson, continues to develop and produce the game and is the final authority on rulings.

Game play
The object of the game is to rescue the required number of Lost Souls (usually five) before the opponent does. To rescue a Lost Soul, a player must initiate a rescue attempt by playing a Hero. The opponent then plays an Evil Character to block the rescue attempt and start a battle. In a battle, players take turns playing Enhancement cards to make their characters stronger. When both players have finished playing Enhancements, the player whose character's Strength is equal to or higher than their opponent's Toughness wins the battle; if the Hero defeats the Evil Character (either by having higher Strength or by removing the Evil Character from the battle via a special ability), the Hero rescues the Lost Soul. After the battle, the winning character remains in play and can be used again on the next turn, and the losing character as well as all Enhancements played during the battle are discarded.

Unlike popular trading card games like Pokémon and Magic: The Gathering, Redemption has no built-in resource system; that is, players are not required to meet any requirements or pay any costs in order to put cards into play. Restrictions or penalties are instead placed on the special abilities of the cards themselves in order to balance game play.

One unique aspect that sets Redemption apart from other CCGs is that while every deck contains both good and evil characters, the game is only won by using good characters. Evil characters can prevent the opponent from winning, but they themselves do not have a chance to win the game.

Card Types
Most types of cards are indicated by an icon in a box in the card's upper-left corner. Certain cards have more than one icon.
Lost Soul: These represent people who have fallen from the path of goodness and need to be saved. When a player draws one from their deck, they immediately put it into play in a region called the "Land of Bondage" and draw another card from their deck to replace it in their hand. When a Hero rescues a Lost Soul, the player takes the card and puts it in their "Land of Redemption" to keep score. Lost Souls are all named "Lost Soul" and can be identified by the lack of an icon box.
Character: These represent Biblical figures who are either on the side of good and trying to save lost souls (Hero) or those trying to thwart the Heroes and prevent lost souls from being saved (Evil Character). They have numerical strength and toughness values in their icon box and may also have special abilities that take effect when they are brought into battle. Heroes have a cross icon and Evil Characters have a dragon icon.
Enhancement: These may be used on characters to boost their battle abilities. They come in two types, good and evil, and may only be used by corresponding Characters. Good Enhancements have an open Bible icon and evil Enhancements have a skull icon.
Dominant: These cards can be played at any time, regardless of whose turn it is, and take effect instantly.  These are the "power cards" of the game, and can often turn the tide of a battle, but the number of these cards in a deck is restricted. Good Dominants have a lamb icon and evil Dominants have a grim reaper icon.
Site: These cards can hold one Lost Soul each. While a Lost Soul is in a site, only Heroes of the same brigade as the Site may "access" the site and rescue the Lost Soul, unless the Hero also uses one of their own Sites of the same brigade that does not have a Lost Soul in it. Sites have a pyramids icon.
Fortress: These cards can store other cards within them or provide some form of protective effect on the player. Fortresses have a castle icon.
Artifact: These provide a supplemental effect on a player's cards or on a battle. Once in play, a player's Artifacts are placed in a face down pile; a player may activate a maximum of one Artifact at a time, on their turn, by putting it on top of their Artifact pile face up (and may deactivate it on their turn by turning it face down). Artifacts have a Holy Grail icon.
Covenant: These are a combination of an Artifact and a good Enhancement and may be used as either (but not both at once). Older Covenants have two icons within their icon box, an open Bible icon on the left and a Holy Gail icon on the right, and newer Covenants have two icon boxes, one for the Enhancement and one for the Artifact.
Curse: These are similar to Covenant cards, but instead are a combination of an Artifact and an evil Enhancement. Curses have the same icon boxes as Covenants but with a snake icon instead of a Holy Grail icon.
City: These cards can be played as either a Site or a Fortress, and have both icons within their icon boxes.

Brigades 
Each Character, Enhancement, Site, Covenant and Curse card belongs to one or more brigades, indicated by the color of their icon box. An Enhancement of a given brigade may only be used by a Character of the same brigade. The colors of the good brigades are Blue, Clay, Gold, Green, Purple, Teal, Red, Silver and White, and the colors of the evil brigades are Black, Brown, Crimson, Gray, Orange, Pale Green and Yellow. A card with a rainbow icon box belongs to all brigades of the corresponding good or evil alignment.

Distribution
The first release of Redemption was in 1995 as a set of 2 starter decks (50-card decks A and B, now out of print) and a set of Limited Edition cards, followed by an Unlimited Edition reprinting.

The game was developed by releasing expansion sets and other starter decks, including, in order of release:

 - Out of print

In August 1996, Cactus offered 750 complete sets of all published Redemption cards at about $150 a piece.

Artwork
Several artists have contributed, including Mike Bennett, Jeff Haynie, Michael Carroll and Mark Poole. Some artwork has been taken from other Christian products and from classical artwork.
Former art director Doug Gray also made many of the images for the cards himself.

History and Popularity

Soon after Magic: The Gathering introduced the idea of a collectible card game (CCG), Rob Anderson realized that the Bible would be a "wonderful source for this type of game". Redemption was soon designed and has since grown to be the top selling Christian CCG. Additionally, recent (as of this writing) final releases of several long-running trading card games, including Lord of the Rings and Star Trek, make Redemption the second-oldest trading card game in consistent production, only behind Magic: The Gathering.

Contributing to the continued popularity of the game is the ability - especially earlier on - to easily collect the cards due to the more common distribution, smaller set size (as of 2006, there were only about 1,800 unique cards), lack of super-rare chase cards and a slow release of sets (one set is released only every 1–2 years).

A rulebook has been developed and gives a reference for understanding the interactions between the card types and the cards.  The most up-to-date rulebook is the 10th anniversary rulebook.  An "exegetical" guide is also available for more seasoned players, containing detailed descriptions of every game term.

Competition
Rob Anderson has maintained that "Redemption Tournaments exist to foster fun and fellowship."

Tournaments
The nature of the game allows for and has resulted in a National Tournament structure (within the U.S.). Tournament levels range from Local to District to State to Regional to the National tournament. The National tournament is held once a year and is held in a different location each year. For official tournaments, prizes are provided by Cactus Game Design and they generally include Redemption booster packs and Tournament Promotional Cards. Redemption Nationals is open to all player; there are no prerequisites for entrance.

Online Tournaments
Redemption tournaments are also held online through Lackey CCG and once through the official Redemption Table Simulator (RTS). Online tournaments can be found through the Cactus website and function in the same way as face to face tournaments.

Categories of Play
At each tournament, one might play Sealed Deck, Booster Draft (instead of multi-player Sealed Deck), Type 1, or Type 2. These categories have different deck building rules. Also, each category (except for Booster Draft) may be divided into two tournaments; a 2-player tournament and a multi-player.

Ranking System
Redemption has also implemented a Redemption National Ranking System (RNRS) allowing players who cannot make it to the National Tournament to be recognized. Points are awarded for placing in each level of tournament.

Reception
In the March 1996 edition of Arcane (Issue 4), Andrew Rilstone pointed out that "CCGs need variety. Redemption fails in this regard. The cards all have very similar values to each other, taking most of the fun out of collecting." He also criticized the gameplay, which he called "repetitive and boring". He concluded by giving it a rating of 5 out of 10, saying, "Each card has a relevant quotation on it, and the rules warn us that if the cards ever contradict the Bible, you should stick with the Bible. Er... thanks."

In the March 1996 edition of Dragon (Issue 227), Rick Swan stated that "Redemption plays like a stripped-down Magic: The Gathering game, too slight to sustain the interest of hard-core card players, but good for beginners."

References

External links
Cactus Game Design
Covenant Games
Redemption Forum
Redemption Connect!, a user-oriented Redemption deck-builder
Three Lions Gaming
Your Turn Games 
Preview in Scrye #8

Card games introduced in 1995
Collectible card games
Games based on the Bible